TAG Group (Holdings) S.A. is a private holding company based in Luxembourg City, Luxembourg. The name 'TAG' is an acronym of Techniques d'Avant Garde. The company generates revenue through its various subsidiaries that offer products and services in the business aviation, motorsports, hospitality, consumer products and real estate industries.

History
TAG was formed in 1977 by Akram Ojjeh and was, until his death, led by Chief Executive Officer Mansour Ojjeh, the son of the founder.

In 1985, TAG Group (Holdings) S.A. purchased Swiss watchmaker Heuer. TAG Group combined the TAG and Heuer brands to create the TAG Heuer brand and also gave its newly acquired watchmaking subsidiary the combined TAG Heuer name. Under TAG Group's ownership, TAG Heuer modernised its product line and significantly increased worldwide sales. LVMH purchased the TAG Heuer subsidiary in 1999 for US$740 million. TAG Group is now primarily a holding company for Ojjeh's shareholdings in TAG Aviation and McLaren Group.

Activities

Aviation

TAG Aeronautics was the distributor of Bombardier aircraft in the Middle East until January 2016. TAG Aviation SA is the Dealer for the HondaJet business aircraft in Northern Europe.

Based in Geneva, Switzerland, TAG Aviation is a provider of business aviation services, aircraft management, aircraft charter, maintenance, sales and acquisitions. TAG Aviation USA, Inc is the American aviation management company located in San Francisco. TAG is a broker for and part owner of the AMI Jet Charter company in San Francisco that holds the FAA air carrier certificate to operate in the US. In late 2007 AMI Jet Charter's air carrier certificate was revoked by the FAA due to alleged operational control violations. However, there is ongoing speculation the FAA had other motives other than operational control. The company now operates solely as a broker of aircraft. In August 2016, TAG Aviation signed a partnership with Stratajet to offer its customers TAG's fixed base operator (FBO) services as part of their booking options.

TAG Farnborough Airport Ltd. is a subsidiary of TAG Aviation which owns the freehold on Farnborough Airport southwest of London in the United Kingdom. The freehold was bought from the UK MOD Ministry of Defence in 2007 following the previous 99 lease agreement signed in 1999.
In 2018, the CAA's decision to grant TAG's application for large controlled zones in a large swathe of airspace near Farnborough was to be investigated by the All-Party Parliamentary Group (APPG) on General Aviation.

Motorsport

During the 1983 season, Mansour Ojjeh had a meeting with McLaren team boss Ron Dennis, who offered Ojjeh the chance of not just a sponsorship deal but having part ownership of McLaren. Ojjeh agreed and the McLaren relationship continues to this day, with the TAG Group currently owning 14% of McLaren Group. Consequently TAG also has stakes in McLaren Group's subsidiaries. McLaren's most famous companies include McLaren Racing and McLaren Automotive.

Formula One engine results
(key) (results in bold indicate pole position; results in italics indicate fastest lap)

Notes
 – Driver did not finish the Grand Prix, but was classified as he completed over 90% of the race distance.
 – Half points awarded as less than 75% of the race distance was completed.

Other
Other areas of business include advanced technology, real estate and consumer products.

Footnotes

References

External links 
TAG Aviation
TAG Farnborough
Aviator by TAG

Investment companies of Luxembourg
Companies based in Luxembourg City